Main Hoon Aparajita is an Indian Hindi-language drama television series that premiered on 27 September 2022 on Zee TV and streams digitally on ZEE5. Produced by Sukesh Motwani under Bodhi Tree Multimedia, it is an official remake of Radhamma Kuthuru. It stars Shweta Tiwari and Manav Gohil.

Premise
Aparajita is deserted by her husband Akshay, leaving her alone to fend for her herself and her three daughters. But she rises to meet every challenge so that her daughters can be strong and independent.

Cast

Main
 Shweta Tiwari as Aparajita Singh: Akshay's  wife; Chhavi, Disha and Asha's mother; Niya's step-mother.
 Manav Gohil as Akshay Singh: Kusumlata's son; Aparajita's husband; Chhavi, Disha, Asha and Niya's father.

Recurring
 Anushka Merchande as Chhavi Singh: Aparajita and Akshay's eldest daughter; elder sister of Disha and Asha; Niya's half-sister
 Dhwani Gori as Disha Singh: Aparajita and Akshay's second daughter; younger sister of Chhavi; elder sister of Asha; Niya's half-sister
 Shruti Choudhary as Asha "Ashu" Singh: Aparajita and Akshay's youngest daughter; younger sister of Chhavi and Disha; Niya's half-sister
 Shweta Gulati as Mohini Akshay Singh: Akshay's second wife; Manish's sister;  Niya's mother; Chhavi, Disha and Asha's step-mother
 Garvita Sadhwani as Niya Singh: Mohini and Akshay's daughter; Aparajita's step-daughter; Chhavi, Disha and Asha's half-sister; Arjun's girlfriend
 Amita Khopkar as Kusumlata Singh: Akshay's mother; Chhavi, Disha, Asha and Niya's grandmother
 Nishikant Dixit as Sunil Thakur: A corrupt politician; Veer's father
 Puneet Tejwani as Manish: Mohini's brother
 Ankit Rana as Vicky
 Varun Kasturia as Arjun, Niya's friend
 Shubhkaran as Veer Thakur: Chhavi's ex–fiance and boyfriend; Sunil's son

Production

Casting
Shweta Tiwari was cast in the titular role of Aparajita. Manav Gohil was cast as Akshay opposite Tiwari. This mark their second collaboration nearly 20 years after Kasautii Zindagii Kay.

Anushka Merchande, Dhwani Gori, Shruti Choudhary and  Garvita Sadhwani were cast in the role of Tiwari's three daughters and one step daughter.

Shweta Gulati cast as the negative lead, Mohini opposite Gohil.

Release
The first promo was released on 1 September 2022. The series premiered on 27 September 2022 on Zee TV.

Reception
The Times of India stated, "Main Hoon Aparajita is quite a run-of-the-mill saga. There are unrealistic situations created to mount the drama. However, Shweta Tiwari manages to hold the show and shines in it."

Pinkvilla mentioned, "Playing a mother comes naturally to Shweta Tiwari and there's solid conviction. Manav Gohil's portrayal of a male chauvinist character will make you hate him for acting so well."

Adaptations

References

External links
 
 Main Hoon Aparajita on ZEE5

Zee TV original programming
2022 Indian television series debuts
Hindi-language television shows